Vel is a 2007 Indian Tamil-language action family drama film written and directed by Hari and produced by M. Chinthamani. It stars Suriya, Asin, Vadivelu and Kalabhavan Mani. Suriya plays a dual role as identical twins. The film also features Charan Raj, Nassar, Lakshmi, Saranya Ponvannan, Ambika in supporting roles. The film's score and soundtrack was composed by Yuvan Shankar Raja. Priyan handled the cinematography, while V. T. Vijayan handled the editing. The film released on 8 November 2007, coinciding with Diwali.

Plot

Thiyagarajan and Sharadha, a couple who have twins, lose one of them while traveling between Tirunelveli and Chennai. The child stolen by a beggar for its gold chain is abandoned at the door of a rich feudal landlord. He is brought up in the family as Vel  and becomes the darling of everybody including Appatha, the family head. Meanwhile the other twin grows up and becomes a private detective Vasu, who falls in love with a television hostess, Swathi. At the same time Vel is given a tough time by Sakkara Pandi, a former minister and local strongman who has his own axe to grind. Vasu is filled with smiles and happiness, while Vel lives with sickles and rage in his battle against Sakkara Pandi.

Vel encounters Vasu while in Madras, and Vasu learns about Vel through Swathi, who spotted Vel while in his village doing a television broadcast. Vasu goes to Vel's village believing he was his long-lost brother. While Vasu was in a bus, Sakkara Pandi planted bombs in the nearby canal believing Vel was in the bus, fortunately, Vasu escapes by jumping out the bus before the bus went past the canal. Vasu is saved by Vel's family who tried to hide him violently inside a car while Vel returned home. They blow their cover when Vasu angrily kicks Vel's uncles outside of the car windshield, enraging Vel to almost slice Vasu's neck until he realizes that Vasu is his look-alike. Vasu and Vel meet and the truth about Vel being adopted is revealed and Appatha breaks down. Vel gets mad and states that despite this, Appatha and her family is his family, and tells Vasu to leave. Vasu asks Vel to come to Madras and see his actual parents, which Vel refuses. Vasu asks to stay for a few days, but Vel refuses him again. Feeling sympathetic for Vasu, Appatha  permits him to stay at Vel's house for a few days, despite an enraged Vel vehemently disagreeing.

During his time, Vasu becomes close with the family and sees how much they love Vel. He realizes that sending Vel to Chennai will be very tough on everyone due to their immense love for him. Vasu befriends Kuzhandaisami, who was the son of Muthupandi, who was Vel's foster father's younger brother. He learns from Kuzhandaisami who Sakkara Pandi is and why he is a enemy to the family. 15 years ago, after Vel's grandfather Velupandi died, Vel's father Rajapandi was the head of the house and he got rid of minister Sakkara Pandi's factories and put him to jail for 3 years, Sakkara Pandi after released from jail, poisoned Rajapandi and his wife Sivagami foods and killed them without evidence while they were travelling back home. Ever since then the family eats only  Appatha's homemade foods.

After Vasu leaves with a heavy heart and promising to not talk about Vel to his parents, he and Vel get into an argument which ended up with them swapping roles. Vasu offers to help Vel with Sakkara Pandi while Vel goes as Vasu to Chennai for 10 days in order to meet his actual parents for the first time, with only Kuzhandaisami knowing the truth. Swathi and Vasu's close friend Moorthy were informed of Vel coming instead of Vasu and help Vel maintain his cover as Vasu and show him around. Vasu uses non-conflict tactics to stop Sakkara Pandi and his factories which succeeds, but Appatha is poisoned by Sakkara Pandi. Kuzhandaisami calls Vel from the village and informs him  this, but the family overhears and Vasu's true identity is revealed and he is disgraced and kicked out.

An enraged Sakkara Pandi, realizing he has been tricked, openly challenges Vasu as "detective naaye" and plants bombs all over the village and threatens to murder Vel's family. Vel and Vasu team up and stop the bombs from blasting, and Vel's uncles apologize to Vasu for their earlier treatment of him, upon realizing his good heart. Vel fights and chases Sakkara Pandi and during the chase, his leg gets caught on the railway. But he had a bomb with him and explained he would do one last killing by killing the civilians on the train. Fortunately, Vel tricks him, cuts off his leg and pushes him down where the bombs explodes, killing Sakkara Pandi. Vasu's parents, had gone to Appatha and pleaded for them to give Vel to them, Appatha sadly agrees. But when Vel comes, she started crying and a few kids were begging Vel not to leave. Vasu pleads with his mother to let Vel stay here and sacrifice her son, shocking everyone. Sharadha cries, but she agrees saying "after all these years, I just hoped I can know he's alive, but instead I met him and talked with him, that is more than enough".

The movie ends on a happy note with Vasu and Vel embracing and the family worshipping the God.

Cast

Production 
Asin was selected as lead heroine of Suriya after the success of Gajini.

Soundtrack
Director Hari once again teamed up with composer Yuvan Shankar Raja for the musical score of Vel after having worked together in Thaamirabharani. The soundtrack of Vel was released on 13 October 2007 and features 6 songs. Lyrics were written by Na. Muthukumar and Hari. Comedian Vadivelu had lent his voice for one of the songs.

The album received mixed reviews.

Release 
The film released on 8 November 2007.

Critical reception
Sify rated 3 out of 5 stars stating "Above Average".Behindwoods rated 2.5 out of 5 stars stating "A masala sale!"Rediff rated 2.5 out of 5 stars stating "The saving graces of Vel include the fact that it is slick, neat, moves at a brisk pace to keep everyone interested, displays no cleavage and has very little blood and gore in spite of the violent storyline".

Box office
This film's theaterical run was 50 days in 17 centers and 100 days in 13 centers making it a commercially successful venture.

References

External links
 

2007 films
Twins in Indian films
2000s masala films
Films directed by Hari (director)
Films scored by Yuvan Shankar Raja
2000s Tamil-language films
Films about twin brothers
Films shot in Tamil Nadu
Films shot in Karaikudi
Films shot in Tirunelveli